The 2013 UCI Track Cycling World Championships took place in Minsk, Belarus from 20 to 24 February 2013 in the Minsk-Arena. The Championships featured 19 events, the same as 2012.

Great Britain, with five gold medals (four in Olympic events), and nine in total topped the medal table. Australia, Germany, France, the United States and Ireland all enjoyed a successful championships.

Becky James of Great Britain, debuting at this level, won four medals, including two gold, in a single Championships, the first British cyclist to do so. Sarah Hammer of the United States also won two gold medals from two events, as did Stefan Bötticher of Germany and Michael Hepburn of Australia.

Martyn Irvine of Ireland broke a 116-year wait for a male Irish track medal with silver in the individual pursuit, only to return an hour later to take Ireland's first ever track gold medal in the Scratch race. Laura Trott suffered her first major senior track defeat, taking silver in the Omnium behind Hammer, but she  retained for a third time her Team Pursuit title with Dani King and debutant and World Junior Road Time Trial champion Elinor Barker.

Medal summary

Shaded events are non-Olympic disciplines.

Medal table

See also

 2012–13 UCI Track Cycling World Ranking
 2012–13 UCI Track Cycling World Cup Classics

References

External links

 Official website
 Results book

 
UCI Track Cycling World Championships
UCI Track Cycling World Championships by year
2013 UCI Track Cycling World Championships
UCI Track Cycling World Championships
Sports competitions in Minsk
Cycle races in Belarus
February 2013 sports events in Europe